Echinopsis scopulicola is a type of cactus native to Bolivia, which contains psychedelic compounds.  Many claimed this species contained mescaline. This was confirmed in 2010 in a study of well-documented individual living plants of the subgenus Trichocereus of the genus Echinopsis. E. scopulicola was noted to contain 0.82% mescaline by dry weight in the outer green layer.

Names
This cactus is synonymous with Trichocereus scopulicola, and its scientific name is Echinopsis scopulicola.

Plant description
This cactus grows 3–4 meters tall, and 8–10 cm in diameter, and is also noted for its unusually short spines. It readily forms hybrids with another Bolivian species, Echinopsis lageniformis.

References

External links

scopulicola
Cacti of South America
Herbal and fungal hallucinogens
Psychedelic phenethylamine carriers
Flora of Bolivia